Satellite is a Polish neo-progressive rock band. It was founded in 2000 by ex-Collage drummer Wojtek Szadkowski as a quartet, with Sarhan Kubeisi on guitar, Robert Amirian as vocalist and bassist, and Krzysiek Palczewski on keyboards.

Their debut album, A Street Between Sunrise and Sunset, was released on March 10, 2003 by Metal Mind Productions. Its follow-up, Evening Games, was released in February 2005, and reached no. 8 at the top 100 best selling records in Poland.

At the beginning of June 2005, regular rehearsals helped develop Satellite as a real band and not just Wojtek's solo studio project. As a result, Satellite recorded the live DVD Evening Dreams (2006) on 22 September 2005.

In March 2007 the band played at the Baja Prog Festival in Mexico and, in November of the same year, they released their third studio album entitled Into the Night. Since then, they have added the bassist Jarek Michalski to the band.

In 2009, Satellite returned with a brand new album, Nostalgia, which was released by Metal Mind Productions (MMP) on 23 February 2009 in Europe and on 10 March 2009 in USA. Most of the album was recorded in Wojtek Szadkowski's home studio. He is also responsible for the album's music and lyrics. The music on this album is a combination of the sound of the 1970s and modern 21st century sound.

Discography

Studio albums

Videos albums

References

External links
 
 

Polish progressive rock groups
Metal Mind Productions artists